Francisco 'Paco' Montañés Claverías (born 8 October 1986) is a Spanish former professional footballer who played as a right winger.

Club career
Born in Castellón de la Plana, Castellón, Valencian Community, Montañés started his senior career in the reserve teams of FC Barcelona. He made his debut for the first team on 13 May 2006, playing the last 20 minutes of a 3–2 away loss against Sevilla FC. He then moved to the lower leagues, with Villarreal CF B and Ontinyent CF.

In August 2010, Montañés joined AD Alcorcón, promoted for the first time to the Segunda División. He rarely missed a game during his two-year spell as the club always retained its league status, and scored nine goals in his second season.

Montañés returned to La Liga with Real Zaragoza, signing a four-year contract on 5 July 2012. He made his official debut on 20 August, featuring the entire 0–1 home defeat to Real Valladolid.

Montañés scored his first goal in the Spanish top flight on 10 November 2012, his team's second in the 5–3 home win over Deportivo de La Coruña. He started in all league matches during the campaign, as the Aragonese were relegated.

On 28 July 2014, Montañés returned to the top tier after agreeing to a four-year deal with RCD Espanyol. On 12 August 2016, he was loaned to Levante UD in a season-long deal.

On 17 August 2017, free agent Montañés signed a two-year contract with division two side CD Tenerife.

Personal life
In 2010, before he made his debut in the top division and thinking this was not a possibility anymore, Montañés contemplated quitting football and becoming a fireman, as his father before him. Nothing came of it eventually.

Honours
Barcelona
La Liga: 2005–06

Levante
Segunda División: 2016–17

Spain U23
Mediterranean Games: 2005

References

External links

 

1986 births
Living people
Sportspeople from Castellón de la Plana
Spanish footballers
Footballers from the Valencian Community
Association football wingers
La Liga players
Segunda División players
Segunda División B players
Tercera División players
FC Barcelona C players
FC Barcelona Atlètic players
FC Barcelona players
Villarreal CF B players
Ontinyent CF players
AD Alcorcón footballers
Real Zaragoza players
RCD Espanyol footballers
Levante UD footballers
CD Tenerife players
Spain youth international footballers
Spain under-21 international footballers
Spain under-23 international footballers
Competitors at the 2005 Mediterranean Games
Mediterranean Games medalists in football
Mediterranean Games gold medalists for Spain